Spring Lake is a small glacial lake in the Town of Berlin, Rensselaer County, New York, United States.  The lake is privately administered by the Spring Lake Association, which consists of the owners of cottages around the perimeter.  There is no public access. The lake is located on a geologic formation known as the Rensselaer Plateau.

References

External links

Lakes of Rensselaer County, New York
Lakes of New York (state)